Portazgo is an administrative neighborhood (barrio) of Madrid belonging to the district of Puente de Vallecas. As of 1 February 2020, it has a population of 29,094.

References 

Wards of Madrid
Puente de Vallecas